Capela de Santa Cruz  is a church located in São Paulo, Brazil. It was completed in 1895.

References

Roman Catholic churches in São Paulo
Churches completed in 1895